World of Silence is the first full-length album by the power metal band by Borealis. It was released in 2008 independently in North America.

Track listing

Personnel
Matt Marinelli – vocals, guitars
Sean Werlick – keyboards
Jamie Smith – bass guitar
Sean Dowell – drums

Technical staff 
 Sean Gregory - recording, engineering, mixing
 Andy VanDette - mastering

References

2008 debut albums